Cecil Taylor Unit is an album by Cecil Taylor recorded in April 1978 and released on the New World label. The album features three performances by Taylor on piano with alto saxophonist Jimmy Lyons, trumpeter Raphe Malik, violinist Ramsey Ameen, bassist Sirone and drummer Ronald Shannon Jackson. The album was recorded during the same sessions that produced 3 Phasis. Taylor is heard on a 96-key Bösendorfer piano about which he commented: it "will stop you cold if you're not ready."

The album is the result of extensive rehearsals, culminating in a four-day session in the studio. Taylor's strategy was to attempt to transcend the limitations of the studio environment by gathering momentum in the hours leading up to the actual recording. In his liner notes, Spencer Richards recalled attending a five-hour rehearsal of the pieces at Taylor's home, during which he was surprised to see the players reading from printed music. He wrote: "What followed was some of the most incredible music/sound I have ever heard... piano, trumpet, alto, and violin talked and chanted with each other, celebrating the joy of this music. What gorgeous sounds they made that afternoon!"

In his section of the liner notes, Ramsey Ameen wrote: "If you approach this music with the archaeologist's shovel, you will find yourself among temple ruins. Should you, however, journey into this music with your gift of hearing, you will discover the enduring promise of an inscription carved in stone, addressed to the sun: 'Come, you will see your temple. When you rise above the horizon, it blazes gold in your face.'"

Reception

The Allmusic review by Michael G. Nastos states "this is as close to as definitive an ensemble as Taylor has launched".

The authors of the Penguin Guide to Jazz Recordings wrote: "This was a superb group, full of contrast but bursting with the spirit of Taylor's music and exultant in its ability to make it work... These are colourful records: Ameen is a key member of the group... Malik and Lyons play bright or wounded or bitingly intense lines, and they play their part in a group chemistry which sometimes has the players contrasting with one another, sometimes combining to push the music forward, sometimes providing a textured background to Taylor's own sustained flights of invention. After the ferocity of his playing and organization in the late '60s, there is more obvious light and shade here, the freedoms more generously stated, the underlying lyricism more apparent."

Writing for Burning Ambulance, Phil Freeman described "Idut" as "an erupting music... offering solo piano passages..., duos and trios, and explosive sections involving the entire band", and compared the sound of the opening of the piece to that of an Elliott Carter string quartet. "Serdab" is depicted as "an interlude of gentle beauty", whereas "Holiday en Masque" is "a half-hour, album-side-long avalanche of sound". Freeman remarked: "Unison passages, arising out of the overall storm of sound like rainbows arcing between thunderclouds, reveal the scored nature of this music and the intense, focused rehearsals Taylor called before the recording began."

Track listing 
All compositions by Cecil Taylor
 "Idut" – 14:40 
 "Serdab" – 14:13 
 "Holiday en Masque" – 29:41

Personnel 
 Cecil Taylor – piano
 Raphe Malik – trumpet
 Jimmy Lyons – alto saxophone
 Ramsey Ameen – violin
 Sirone – double bass
 Ronald Shannon Jackson – drums

References 

1978 albums
Cecil Taylor albums
New World Records albums
Albums recorded at CBS 30th Street Studio